Taught by Experts is the fourth studio album by Peter Allen, released in 1976. It spawned the hit "I Go to Rio". The album featured such musicians as Thom Rotella, Jerome Richardson, Lesley Gore and Dusty Springfield.

Track listing
"Puttin' Out Roots" (Peter Allen) – 3:32
"She Loves to Hear the Music" (Allen, Carole Bayer Sager) – 3:16
"Back Doors Crying" (Allen, Sager) – 4:46
"I Go to Rio" (Allen, Adrienne Anderson) – 3:17
"Planes" (Allen, Sager) – 3:05
"Quiet Please, There's a Lady on Stage" (Allen, Sager) – 5:08
"This Time Around" (Allen) – 3:15
"The More I See You" (Mack Gordon, Harry Warren) – 3:30
"Harbour" (Allen) – 3:36
"(I've Been) Taught by Experts" (Allen, Hal Hackady) – 3:12
"Six-Thirty Sunday Morning/New York, I Don't Know About You" (Allen) – 5:01

Personnel
 Peter Allen - vocals, piano, electric piano
 Thom Rotella - acoustic guitar
 John Jarvis - organ
 Alan Estes - percussion
 Judy Elliot - backing vocals
 Chuck Domanico - bass, acoustic bass
 Jim Gordon - drums
 Jim Keltner - drums
 Marilyn Baker - violin
 Jerome Richardson - saxophone
 Lesley Gore - backing vocals
 Dusty Springfield - backing vocals
 Brenda Russell - backing vocals

Charts

Certifications

References

1976 albums
Peter Allen (musician) albums
A&M Records albums
Albums produced by Brooks Arthur